"The One with the Ride-Along" is the twentieth episode of Friends' fifth season. It first aired on NBC in the United States on April 29, 1999. In the episode, Ross, Joey, and Chandler go on a ride-along with Gary, Phoebe's new boyfriend.

Plot
Ross' ex-wife Emily is getting married again, so the group does its best to distract him. Phoebe (Lisa Kudrow) returns from a ride-along with her cop boyfriend, Gary (Michael Rapaport), which prompts the guys to follow suit and share the experience. Joey buys a delicious sandwich but is not allowed to eat it in Gary's car, so he keeps talking about it, much to the annoyance of Ross and Chandler. Ross accidentally turns on the beacon, prompting Gary to move him from the front seat. During the ride, a car backfire scares them all, leading to Joey diving over Ross in an attempt to save him. This causes problems between Chandler and Joey because Joey apparently wanted to save Ross instead of Chandler, his best friend. However, it turns out that Joey was not trying to save Ross, but only his sandwich. To show Chandler how much he values their friendship, he allows him to have one bite of the sandwich.

Monica decides to organize photos, but Rachel accidentally drops a box of other pictures on it, ruining all Monica's work. Due to being upset, the two decide to make margaritas, but they do not have the ingredients, so they decide to steal them from Ross' apartment, where Rachel intercepts a message from Emily, who has second thoughts about her upcoming wedding and the divorce with Ross. Monica thinks they should erase the message, but Rachel thinks Ross deserves to know the truth. During the discussion, she accidentally erases the message.

After being "saved", Ross is filled with a new-found respect for life, which he reports to his own answering machine, resulting in the message being heard by the girls, who are still at his apartment. Rachel tells Ross about the message from Emily, but Ross wants to call her back, because he wants to seize every new opportunity. Rachel talks this idea out of Ross' mind by convincing him that it is not the day of seizing stuff, but escaping from stuff, such as "death" and from Emily.

Production
"The One with the Ride-Along" was co-written by Shana Goldberg-Meehan and Seth Kurland. The episode was directed by Gary Halvorson.

Reception
In its original American broadcast, "The One with the Ride-Along" finished fourth in ratings for the week of April 19–25, 1999, with a Nielsen rating of 13.9. It was the fourth highest rated show on the NBC network that week, after the NBC Sunday Movie: Noah's Ark, ER, and Frasier. In the United Kingdom the episode premiered on Sky1 on May 20, 1999, and was watched by 2.02 million viewers, making the program the most watched on the channel that week.

References

External links

1999 American television episodes
Friends (season 5) episodes